Niederselters is an urban district (Ortsteil) of the community Selters in Hessen, Germany. Niederselters station lies on the Main-Lahn Railway. With Oberbrechen station, it is one of two stations in Brechen. Nearby is a Cistercian nunnery Kloster Gnadenthal, Hessen in 3 km.

Villages in Hesse